Arum is a genus of flowering plants in the family Araceae, native to Europe, northern Africa, and western and central Asia, with the highest species diversity in the Mediterranean region. Frequently called arum lilies, they are not closely related to the true lilies Lilium. Plants in closely related Zantedeschia are also called "arum lilies".

They are rhizomatous, herbaceous perennial plants growing to 20–60 cm tall, with sagittate (arrowhead-shaped) leaves 10–55 cm long. The flowers are produced in a spadix, surrounded by a 10–40 cm long, distinctively coloured spathe, which may be white, yellow, brown, or purple. Some species are scented, others not. The fruit is a cluster of bright orange or red berries.

All parts of the plants, including the berries, are poisonous, containing calcium oxalate as raphides. In spite of this, the plant has a history of culinary use among Arab peasants in Palestine who practised leaching the toxins from the plant before the leaves were consumed. 

The genus name is the Latinized form of the Greek name for these plants, aron.

Inflorescence and pollination 

The flowers are borne on a poker-shaped inflorescence called a spadix, which is partially enclosed in a spathe or leaf-like hood of varying colour. The flowers are hidden from sight, clustered at the base of the spadix with a ring of female flowers at the bottom and a ring of male flowers above them.

Above the male flowers is a ring of hairs forming an insect trap. The insects are trapped beneath the ring of hairs and are dusted with pollen by the male flowers before escaping and carrying the pollen to the spadices of other plants, where they pollinate the female flowers. Once the plant is pollinated, the small hairs wither away and the trapped insects are released.

After the inflorescence opens, the spadix heats up well above ambient temperature, due to a phenomenon called thermogenesis. This is caused by the rapid consumption of starch in cyanide insensitive respiration, which is biochemically different from the respiration normally found in plants. The heat is used to vaporize odour components, which in species with short "flower-stalks" cause a faecal smell. This in turn attracts the small flies and gnats that are to be trapped within the inflorescence. As the time required for successful pollination to occur can be several days, many of the small insects nevertheless die within the flower due to their short lifespan. Therefore, dead insects are frequently found within the inflorescence, when opened, sometimes leading the finder to believe it is a carnivorous plant – but that is not the case. No digestive enzymes or similar components are present; and in fact, once pollinated, the entire inflorescence starts withering except the central part, from which the berries later emerge.

Pollination-wise, the species of Arum can be split into two (or three) distinct groups. The "cryptic" species have the inflorescence on a relatively short stalk, and the odour released during the thermogenesis is recognizable to the human nose as distinctively faecal. These species are visited by insects with some relation to dung, such as owl-midges (Psychodidae) or fungus-gnats (Sciara). In northern Europe, only the cryptic-flowered species are found.

The other main group are called "flag" species, due to the inflorescence being on a long stalk. These species also exhibit thermogenesis, but if an odour is released it is not recognizable to the human nose, and it is debated if pollinators are attracted by a non-recognizable smell, the thermogenesis itself or visual attraction.

Finally the closely related A. idaeum and A. creticum does not seem to fit any of the two groups. A. creticum appears to be of the "flag" group but, as the only species, emits a pleasing lemony smell. The apparently "cryptic" A. idaeum does not emit a recognizable smell.

Species 

Formerly placed here:
 Arisaema triphyllum (syn. Arum triphyllum)
 Dracunculus vulgaris (syn. Arum dracunculus)
 Sauromatum venosum (syn. Arum cornutum)

See also 
 List of plants known as lily

References 

 
Araceae genera
Flora of Kurdistan
Taxa named by Carl Linnaeus